Jacob Dawson (born 2 November 1993) is a British rower.

Rowing career
Dawson won a bronze medal at the 2018 World Rowing Championships in Plovdiv, Bulgaria, as part of the coxless four with Thomas Ford, Adam Neill and James Johnston.
He won a silver medal in the eight at the 2019 European Rowing Championships. He won a bronze medal at the 2019 World Rowing Championships in Ottensheim, Austria as part of the eight with Thomas George, James Rudkin, Josh Bugajski, Moe Sbihi, Oliver Wynne-Griffith, Matthew Tarrant, Thomas Ford and Henry Fieldman.

In 2021, he won a European gold medal in the eight in Varese, Italy.

References

External links

Jacob Dawson at British Rowing

Living people
1993 births
British male rowers
World Rowing Championships medalists for Great Britain
Rowers at the 2020 Summer Olympics
Medalists at the 2020 Summer Olympics
Olympic medalists in rowing
Olympic bronze medallists for Great Britain